Philipp Kohlschreiber was the defending champion, but was forced to withdraw due to illness.

Fernando González won in the final 7–6(7–4), 6–7(4–7), 6–3, against Simone Bolelli.

Seeds

Draw

Finals

Top half

Bottom half

External links
Draw
Qualifying draw

Singles